The Holsworthy railway line was located in South-western Sydney. It was constructed during World War I, mainly using labour from the Holsworthy Internment Camp. Its purpose was to service the  army facilities opening on 21 January 1918.

Constructed largely with second-hand materials, It branched off the Main South line north of Liverpool station crossing the Georges River via a bridge that had nine 30 metre approach spans which came from old crossings of the Wollondilly River by the Main South line near  and of Solitary Creek by the Main Western line near .

The main span was a  truss from the Main South line bridge over Argyle Street, .

After the line opened, several additional sidings were constructed. The Ordnance Stores Siding opened 29 April 1919 with standing room for 75 four-wheel wagons on three loop sidings. On 2 October 1923 the line was curtailed to Anzac Rifle Range. After falling into disuse, World War II resulted in the line being restored. After declining again, the line was formally closed in June 1977. The only tangible signs of the line today are the piers across the Georges River and a bridge across Harris Creek,adjacent to Heathcote Road, that today is used by foot and cycle traffic.

The site will also be served by the Moorebank Intermodal Terminal which will be connected to the Southern Sydney Freight Line near  station.

References

Closed railway lines in Sydney
Military railways
Railway lines opened in 1918
Railway lines closed in 1977
1918 establishments in Australia
1977 disestablishments in Australia